Gurunhuel is a commune in the Côtes-d'Armor department of Brittany in northwestern France.

Population

The inhabitants of Gurunhuel are known in French as gurunhuelois.

See also
Communes of the Côtes-d'Armor department
List of the works of the Maître de Lanrivain

References

External links

Communes of Côtes-d'Armor